The Secaucus Reporter is a weekly community newspaper serving Secaucus, in Hudson County, New Jersey. The paper is one of nine weekly publications produced by The Hudson Reporter Assoc., L.P. The company's main office is located in Bayonne.

Hudson Reporter publications focus on local politics and community news. In addition to articles written by the staff, the papers print readers' letters to the editor.

The Secaucus Reporter was published under the banner The Secaucus Press before being purchased by The Hudson Reporter.

References

External links
Secaucus Reporter, official site
Secaucus, NJ, town site

Secaucus, New Jersey
Mass media in Hudson County, New Jersey
Newspapers published in New Jersey